Hippomelas is a genus of beetles in the family Buprestidae, containing the following species:

 Hippomelas aeneocupreus Kerremans, 1919
 Hippomelas brevipes Casey, 1909
 Hippomelas martini Nelson, 1996
 Hippomelas mexicanus (Laporte & Gory, 1837)
 Hippomelas parkeri Nelson, 1996
 Hippomelas planicauda Casey, 1909
 Hippomelas saginatus (Mannerheim, 1837)
 Hippomelas sphenicus (LeConte, 1854)

References

Buprestidae genera